David Boutin is a former member of the New Hampshire Senate. He served from 2010 to 2016, representing the 16th district. He previously served as member of the New Hampshire House of Representatives for Manchester Ward 1 from 1996 to 2000 and won a special election to represent the town of Hooksett in the House of Representatives from 2008 to 2010.

References

Republican Party members of the New Hampshire House of Representatives
Republican Party New Hampshire state senators